François Pierrot (born November 2, 1961 in Mont Saint Martin) is director of research in The Montpellier Laboratory of Computer Science, Robotics, and Microelectronics (LIRMM).

Biography
Former student at the Mechanical Engineering Department of École Normale Supérieure de Cachan, holding a PhD in Automatic Control from the Montpellier 2 University, Dr. François Pierrot now serves as a director of research for the French National Centre for Scientific Research (CNRS) in the LIRMM. For more than 15 years, he has been working to create new robots considering simultaneously mechanical design and control strategies, on theoretical aspects as well as in close cooperation with industrial partners in the fields of industry, health and education. François Pierrot participated in the creation of the fastest parallel robot in the world's patent, acquired by Adept, a U.S. leader in robotic systems. In 2011 he received the First CNRS Medal of Innovation.

Researches
His innovative research has been distinguished in France (ADER Prize, 2003 and 2008  ), in Europe (European Commission IST Prize, 2002) and in Japan (Robotic Society of Japan Prize for Innovation ) for results in various fields such as medical robotics, entertainment robotics or industrial robotics. He is currently involved in fundamental research projects at national and European level, as well as in applied research projects in cooperation with the Tecnalia Foundation, Spain.

Awards
 2011 - CNRS Medal of Innovation
 2010 – Best paper award (finalist), IEEE ICRA, Anchorage, USA ("MoonWalker, a Lower Limb Exoskeleton able to Sustain Bodyweight using a Passive Force Balancer")
 2008 – Prize for Innovation, ADER Languedoc-Roussillon (pick-and-place robotics)
 2007 – Finalist of IEEE/IFR Invention Award (industrial robotics)
 2003 – Prize for Innovation, ADER Languedoc-Roussillon (medical robotics)
 2002 – IST Prize, European Commission (robot for education)
 2000 – Prize for Creation of Innovating StartUp Companies, French Ministry of Research
 1995 - Prize for Innovation, Robotic Society of Japan, (industrial robotics); first non Japanese researcher to get this prize.
 1992 – Best Paper Award, ISRAM '92, Santa Fe, New Mexico, USA (robust control)

Publications
Publications of François Pierrot portal HAL-LIRMM (Management System Publications of LIRMM)

Technology transferred to industry
Several robots have been adopted by industry for development past their prototype stages, some of which are listed below:

References

External links
 DEXTER team website
 Symétrie website 
 CEA website
 JEKT
 Wany Robotics website 
 Technalia Foundation website
 New Robotics Will Soon Revolutionize Industry And Services World

Media
 Quattro robot video - Objectif 100G  
 UraneSX video 

1961 births
Living people
French roboticists
French mechanical engineers